NYU or nyu may refer to:

New York University
Nyaung U Airport IATA code
Nyungwe language ISO 639-3 code
Nyū District, Fukui
Elfen Lied character
New York Undercover TV series